Htauk Kyant is a village in Kale Township, Kale District, in the Sagaing Region of western Burma.

In 1942 the Battle of the Htauk Kyant Roadblock was fought here between Japanese troops and Allied forces retreating from Rangoon towards India.Htauk Kyant is a village where Burmese lived before Chin settle d around this village.

References

External links
Maplandia World Gazetteer

Populated places in Kale District
Kale Township
World War II sites in Burma